Aldridge-Brownhills was an urban district in Staffordshire, England from 1966 to 1974.

The district was formed in accordance with a recommendation of the Local Government Commission for England on 1 April 1966. It was created by the amalgamation of the Aldridge and Brownhills urban districts, along with part of Lichfield Rural District, and small parts of the county boroughs of Birmingham and Walsall and the municipal borough of Sutton Coldfield.

The urban district had a short existence, as it was abolished in 1974. In that year the Local Government Act 1972 reorganised local administration throughout England and Wales, and Aldridge-Brownhills became part of the new Metropolitan Borough of Walsall.

There is still an Aldridge-Brownhills parliamentary constituency.

References

Districts of England abolished by the Local Government Act 1972
History of Staffordshire
Walsall
Urban districts of England
Aldridge
1966 establishments in England
Unparished areas in the West Midlands (county)